The DFB-Pokal 2009–10 was the 30th season of the cup competition, Germany's second-most important title in women's football. The tournament started on 13 September 2009 and the final was held on 15 May 2010 in Cologne. FCR 2001 Duisburg defeated FF USV Jena 1–0, thus defending their title from the previous season and claiming their third. The final set a European record for the largest attendance of a national women's club game with 26,282 visitors in the RheinEnergieStadion, Cologne.

Participating clubs
The following teams are qualified for the DFB-Pokal:

1st round 

The top seven clubs from last year's Bundesliga season were automatically qualified for the second round of the cup. These were Turbine Potsdam, Bayern Munich, FCR 2001 Duisburg, FFC Frankfurt, Essen-Schönebeck, Hamburg, and SC Freiburg. The other clubs from the Bundesliga all won their first round match.

2nd round

3rd round

Quarter-finals

Semi-finals

Final

References

DFB-Pokal Frauen seasons
Pokal
Fra